Philotarsus is a genus of loving barklice in the family Philotarsidae. There are about 18 described species in Philotarsus.

Species
These 18 species belong to the genus Philotarsus:

 Philotarsus arizonicus Mockford, 2007
 Philotarsus californicus Mockford, 2007
 Philotarsus digitatus Mockford, 2007
 Philotarsus fraternus Enderlein, 1901
 Philotarsus incurvatus Mockford, 2007
 Philotarsus kwakiutl Mockford, 1951
 Philotarsus lobatus Mockford, 2007
 Philotarsus longipennis Mockford, 2007
 Philotarsus mexicanus Mockford, 2007
 Philotarsus nebulosus Mockford, 2007
 Philotarsus parviceps Roesler, 1954
 Philotarsus picicornis (Fabricius, 1793)
 Philotarsus potosinus Mockford, 2007
 Philotarsus sinensis Li, 1997
 Philotarsus thorntoni Turner, 1984
 Philotarsus zangdaicus Li, 2002
 Philotarsus zangxiaoicus Li, 2002
 † Philotarsus bullicornis Enderlein, 1911

References

External links

 

Psocomorpha
Articles created by Qbugbot